Vitra can refer to:

 Vitra (furniture): a Swiss (originally German) manufacturer of designer furniture
 Vitra Design Museum
 VitrA (sanitaryware): a Turkish sanitaryware, bathroom furniture, brassware and ceramic tiles company